Duquesne was an 80-gun  80-gun ship of the line of the French Navy, designed by Sané.

Built on brand new docks as Zélandais, she was renamed Duquesne following the Bourbon Restoration, on 27 April 1814, while she was still being commissioned. On 23 March 1815, during the Hundred Days, she was renamed Zélandais, and then Duquesne again on 15 July when Louis XVIII returned on the throne.

She took part in the Invasion of Algiers in 1830 under Captain Bazoche. After the July Revolution, she was again renamed Zélandais.

She was again used as a troopship, was used as a hulk in 1832 in Brest, and was eventually struck in 1836.

The figurehead of Duquesne is on display at the Musée national de la Marine in Paris. An oil painting in Brest naval museum shows Duquesne as a hulk during the fire of the harbour.

References
 Jean-Michel Roche, Dictionnaire des Bâtiments de la flotte de guerre française de Colbert à nos jours, tome I

Ships of the line of the French Navy
Ships built in France
Bucentaure-class ships of the line
1813 ships